Roman Mikhaylovich Dzeneladze (12 April 1933 – 11 April 1966) was a featherweight Greco-Roman wrestler from Georgia. In 1956 he won a Soviet title and a bronze medal at the 1956 Summer Olympics. He died in a car crash together with fellow Olympic wrestler Avtandil Koridze.He was married to Neli Dzneladze for nearly 9 years and they had two children together.

References

1933 births
1966 deaths
Olympic wrestlers of the Soviet Union
Wrestlers at the 1956 Summer Olympics
Soviet male sport wrestlers
Male sport wrestlers from Georgia (country)
Olympic bronze medalists for the Soviet Union
Olympic medalists in wrestling
Sportspeople from Tbilisi
Medalists at the 1956 Summer Olympics
Dynamo sports society athletes